Martin Eberts (born 1957) is a German diplomat. From 2014 to 2018 he served as the Director General of the German Institute Taipei. In 2020 he was appointed as the Consul General at the German Consulate in Osaka, Japan.

Career 
Eberts began his preparatory service for the Federal Foreign Office in 1986 and completed the training program in 1991. He was appointed as an advisor for press and public relations at the German Embassy in Hungary and, from 1991 to 1993, worked as an advisor for Central Europe at the Foreign Office in Bonn. From 1993 to 1997 he as a political and public relations officer at the German Embassy in Saudi Arabia. The following year Eberts was part of an exchange program with the Ministry of Europe and Foreign Affairs in France, advising on Eastern European affairs. He was made deputy head of the Economic and Trade Department at the German Embassy in France in 1998, serving in this capacity until 2001.

Ebert returned to Germany in 2001 to work as a lecturer in the Legation Council at the Foreign Office in Berlin. From 2005 to 2009 he was the deputy head of the political department at the German Embassy in Japan. For the next three years Eberts served as the Head of the Department for German Cultural Institutions Abroad. From 2012 to 2014 he served as the Head of the Department for Economics and Global Issues at the German Embassy in Brazil.

In August 2014 Eberts succeeded Michael Zickerick as the Director General of the German Institute Taipei, serving as the diplomatic representative of Germany to Taiwan until July 2018. While serving as Director General, Eberts spoke in favor of Holocaust education in Taiwan, stating that learning about the sufferings during that period, as well as the stories of victims and survivors, would help prevent future tragedies. He also spoke out against Chinese coercion against Taiwan, such as China's insistence that international airlines refer to Taiwan as part of China, calling China's demands "childish". He voiced support for Taiwan's inclusion in global issues involving public health, aviation, and antiterrorism.

On 20 July 2018 he named Taiwanese professor Tseng Tzu-feng as an honorary director of the Institute for Southern Taiwan. Eberts was succeeded by Thomas Prinz on 30 July 2018. Later that year he was appointed as Head of the Political Department at the German Embassy in Indonesia.

In July 2020, Eberts was appointed as the Consul General at the German Consulate General in Osaka.

Personal life 
Eberts studied history, German literature, and theology at the University of Bonn.

He is Catholic and married with four children.

References 

Living people
1957 births
21st-century German diplomats
Consuls
Director Generals of the German Institute Taipei
German Roman Catholics
University of Bonn alumni